Behçet Yıldırım (born 10 May 1959) is a Turkish politician from the Peoples' Democratic Party (HDP), who has served as a Member of Parliament for Adıyaman.

Born in Adıyaman, he graduated from Çukurova University Faculty of Medicine and worked at an Adıyaman hospital for maternity and children. He was a member of the Human Rights Foundation and served as the Democratic Society Congress delegate for Adıyaman. He was elected as a Member of Parliament in the June 2015 general election, and re-elected in November 2015 general election.

See also
25th Parliament of Turkey

References

External links
MP profile on the Grand National Assembly website
 Collection of all relevant news items at Haberler.com

Peoples' Democratic Party (Turkey) politicians
Deputies of Adıyaman
Çukurova University alumni
People from Adıyaman
1959 births
Living people
Members of the 25th Parliament of Turkey
Members of the 26th Parliament of Turkey